Barli may refer to:
Barli Vocational Institute for Rural Women in Indore
Barlı, Azerbaijan
Barli, Vizianagaram, a village in Vizianagaram district, Andhra Pradesh
Barli Inscription